Acugamasus montanus is a species of mite in the family Ologamasidae. It is found in Europe.

This species was formerly in the genus Gamasellus.

References

montanus
Articles created by Qbugbot
Animals described in 1936